Beinn Heasgarnich is a mountain in the Breadalbane region of the Scottish Highlands. It lies about 2 km south of Loch Lyon.

References

 The Munros, Scottish Mountaineering Trust, 1986, Donald Bennet (Editor) 

Munros
Mountains and hills of the Southern Highlands
One-thousanders of Scotland
Marilyns of Scotland
Mountains and hills of Perth and Kinross